Cindy Timchal (born September 14, 1954) is an American lacrosse coach.  She is the head women's lacrosse coach at the United States Naval Academy. She has coached for some of the top programs in college women's lacrosse, including Northwestern University, University of Maryland. At Maryland Timchal coached the Terrapins to seven straight NCAA Division I Women's Lacrosse Championships.

Background
Timchal grew up in Havertown, Pennsylvania, and despite not playing lacrosse in high school, Timchal went on to play on the lacrosse team at West Chester University. While at West Chester, Timchal was also a member of the Tennis and Track and Field teams. After graduating college, Timchal got her first coaching job at Unionville High School, where she was a member of the coaching staff for the lacrosse, field hockey and basketball teams. In 1979, after coaching for two years at Unionville, Timchal began her college coaching career at The University of Pennsylvania, where she was an assistant for the lacrosse and field hockey teams.

Coaching at Northwestern
Timchal's head coaching career started in 1982 when she took on the program at Northwestern University. She stayed with the Wildcats for nine years, coaching them to five NCAA Tournament appearances in 1983, 1984, 1986, 1987, and 1988. Timchal's record at Northwestern was 76–40.  She posted a winning season for eight out of her nine seasons.

Coaching at Maryland
In 1991, Timchal left Northwestern to pursue her coaching career at the University of Maryland. Although Maryland had a history of being a powerhouse in lacrosse, the Terps only had one NCAA title which they won in 1986. In just her first season as head coach, Timchal led her team to an NCAA final as well as a 14–3 record before they lost to Virginia in the NCAA championship. The next season, 1992, Maryland would make it to the finals, where they would defeat Harvard 11–10 in overtime as Timchal would gain her first national championship. Yet following the loss in the 1994 finals, to Princeton, Maryland went on a 50-game winning streak. This would take place during Maryland's seven-year reign as national champions from 1995 to 2001. This included a 13-5 national championship win over Princeton in 1995. Starting with the 1995 Championship title, Timchal and her Terps went on to win six more NCAA Championships in a row. The seven straight championship streak was completed with the 2001 title game, in which Maryland posted a perfect 23–0 season and defeated Georgetown in double overtime. Overall, Timchal's record at Maryland was 260-46 and her winning percentage was 85%.

Coaching at Navy
On August 5, 2006, Timchal was named the head coach for the women's lacrosse team at the United States Naval Academy. Timchal was given the opportunity by athletic director, Chet Gladchuk, to become the first women's lacrosse coach as Navy decided to elevate its club program to the Division I level. Gladchuck described Timchal as “the finest coach in the history of the game”. Timchal was quick to make Navy a league power. As a member of the Patriot League, Navy challenged the top teams in the league and went on to achieve a record of 13–4 in just their first year as a program in 2008. Timchal's 2009 season saw similar success. In 2010, Navy broke out, going 17-4 while capturing their first Patriot League title and their first NCAA tournament appearance. It took only three years for Navy to achieve an NCAA appearance, the fastest a new team had qualified in 13 years. Their success in 2010 left Navy ranked 19th nationally. In 2017 Coach Timchal's team again won the Patriot League, earning a berth in the NCAA tournament. In the quarter-finals Navy defeated the reigning national champions, North Carolina, to earn their first appearance in the Final Four, where they lost to Boston College, 16–15. Navy's final record was an impressive 18–5.

Former players as coaches
Throughout Timchal's coaching career, she has accumulated a growing coaching tree, as many of her former players have gone on to become coaches. In the 2011 season there were over 20 collegiate lacrosse coaches who had been coached by Timchal during her time as Maryland's head coach. The following are a few of the coaches that represent five different leagues in Women's lacrosse. To represent the Patriot League, Jen Adams is the head coach of Loyola University in Maryland. Following in Timchal's footsteps as the head coach for the University of Maryland is Cathy Reese. Maryland assistant, Quinn Carney is also a former Timchal player.
Atlantic Coast Conference coaches include Maryland assistant, Quinn Carney, as well as Duke head coach Kerstin Kimmel, Duke assistant coach, Alex Kahoe, and Boston College head coach, Acacia Walker. Timchal's players are involved in the Colonial League through Katie Doolittle the head coach at Towson University, and Sonia Lamonica, Towson's assistant coach. The NLC includes head coach of High Point's team, Megan Cassara. Former players of Timchal's are currently head coaches in the Big Ten, including Kelly Amonte Hiller at Northwestern, Missy Doherty at Pennsylvania State, and Alexis Venechanos at Ohio State.

Coaching style
Timchal's demonstrated her unique coaching style through techniques that translated on and off the field. As Maryland's head coach, she hired Dr. Jerry Lynch, a well-known author and psychiatrist in order to mentally prepare her team. Timchal also hired Gary Gait as an assistant coach. Gait was a Major League Lacrosse and National Lacrosse League player at the time. Timchal tested these resources, which translated into success on the field.

Awards and achievements
The following awards and achievements were listed on gonavy.com:
-Two-time National Coach of the Year
-8 NCAA Championships- the 25th most all-time in any sport by a coach and fourth most in a women's sport in NCAA history
-7 consecutive NCAA Championships (1995–2001)- tied for the seventh most in any sport in NCAA Division I history and third most in a women's sport
-394 victories, which is the most in NCAA history for any division
-A career winning percentage of .790 
-499 games coached which is the second most in NCAA history 
-The most NCAA tournament appearances with 23 NCAA Tournament appearances
-Only coach in NCAA history to lead three different teams to NCAA Tournament 
-18 NCAA quarterfinal appearances
-Has coached 54 different players who received 96 All-America honors
-Four-time ACC Coach of the Year
- Inducted into the Delaware County sports hall of fame 
In 2012, Timchal was inducted into the National Lacrosse Hall of Fame.

References

External links
 Navy profile

1954 births
Living people
Maryland Terrapins women's lacrosse coaches
Navy Midshipmen women's lacrosse coaches
Northwestern Wildcats women's lacrosse coaches
Penn Quakers women's lacrosse coaches
West Chester Golden Rams women's lacrosse players
West Chester Golden Rams women's tennis players
West Chester Golden Rams women's track and field athletes
High school basketball coaches in the United States
High school lacrosse coaches in the United States
People from Haverford Township, Pennsylvania
American women's basketball coaches
Lacrosse players from Pennsylvania
Sportspeople from Delaware County, Pennsylvania
College field hockey coaches in the United States